Kang Jin-sung (Hangul: 강진성) (born October 19, 1993, in Seoul) is a South Korean infielder for the Doosan Bears of the KBO League.

References 

Doosan Bears players
KBO League infielders
South Korean baseball players
1993 births
Living people